The Bardigiano is a breed of small horse from the Emilia Romagna region of Italy. It takes its name from the town of Bardi, in the Apennines of Parma, and is principally associated with the surrounding area and the Valle del Ceno.  The mountain environment and steep, rough terrain of the area have contributed to produce a robust, hardy breed, agile and sure-footed over difficult ground. Although some males and all females are under , the Bardigiano is always considered a horse in its home country. The stud book was established in 1977, and is held by the Associazione Provinciale Allevatori, the regional animal breeders' association, of Parma. The breed is widely distributed in Italy, with breeders in 26 Italian provinces; a recent study examined 3556 stud book entries for living horses. Due to these relatively large numbers, the breed is not considered to be at risk of extinction, but is classed as "vulnerable".

The Bardigiano is used for activities that range from farm work to competitive driving and riding. They are also used extensively for pony trekking. In 1994, the breed standard was modified with the intention of increasing the suitability of the Bardigiano as a saddle horse while preserving its character.

Breed Characteristics

The height range for the Bardigiano is fixed at 140–149 cm for males and 135–147 cm for females; horses outside these ranges are not admitted for registration.  The only recognized coat colour is bay, and dark bay is preferred.  Chestnuts and light bays are not recognized.  Limited rabicano and white markings on the legs and face are allowed, but white facial markings with excessive lateral extension (commonly referred to as "bald-faced") are not.  Physical characteristics of the breed include a small head with a straight or concave profile, low withers, straight back, deep girth, and overall a muscular appearance.

Breed History
The Bardigiano appears to have descended from the horses ridden by Belgian Gauls during their invasions into Italy during Roman times.  This is the same ancestor from which the Haflinger appears to have developed. Over the centuries, the Bardigiano has adapted to the rough, mountainous habitat in the Northern Apennine region of Italy.

As well as having some relationship to the Haflinger, the breed also bears characteristics similar to the English Exmoor and Dales ponies as well as the Asturcon.

During World War I and World War II, Bardigiano mares were used to produce first-class mules, and in the process the number of purebred Bardigianos was significantly reduced.  After World War II, in a move that is now widely considered a mistake, a diverse range of stallions from various breeds were introduced to reestablish the breed.  However, this caused the breed to deteriorate and begin to lose its defining characteristics.  Thus, in 1972, a committee was formed that has since successfully reestablished the Bardigiano breed.

See also
List of horse breeds

References

Horse breeds
Horse breeds originating in Italy